Buguda is a town in the Ghumusara area of Ganjam district in the state of Odisha, India. Buguda is approximately 70 kilometres from Berhampur, a major city in Odisha.

Geography

It has an average elevation of 84 meteres (275 feet).

Demographics

's India census, Buguda had a population of 13,253. Males constituted 51% of the population and females 49%. Buguda has an average literacy rate of 67%, higher than the national average of 59.5%; with a male literacy rate of 76% and a female literacy rate of 58%. 14% of the population is under 6 years of age.

Climate and regional setting
Maximum summer temperature is 37 °C; minimum winter temperature is 14 °C. The mean daily temperature varies from 33 °C to 38 °C. May is the hottest month; December is the coldest. The average annual rainfall is 1250 mm and the region receives monsoon and torrential rainfall from July to October.

Features

Buguda has a Court of Law, Tahasil office, block office, sub-registration office, and a police station. A well-equipped government hospital is the prime institution of health care in the region.

Two major learning institutions in Buguda are People's High School for Boys, and Sri Biranchi Narayan Girls High School for Girls.  A Bachelors Graduate college with Honors facility is the main institution of higher education in the vicinity.

Education

1. New era public school. 
2. Saraswati Sishu Mandir.
3. Sobhaniya Sikshyashram.
4. Biranchinarayan public school (day care English medium school)
5. Aurobinda purnaga sihkya kendra

Places of interest

Buddhakhola: At a distance of about 3 km towards the north of Buguda is Buddhakhol, which is a scenic spot frequently visited by tourists and picnickers. Amidst natural surroundings there is a cluster of five temples on the top of a hill, dedicated to Lord Siva, popularly known as Panchu Mahadeva. At the upper most part of the hill a perennial stream forms a waterfall. A number of Buddhist remains have been found at the place which give the impression that it was a Buddhist settlement in ancient days. Not far from the place there are numerous caves one of which is called Siddha Gumpha where Buddhist monks were said to have performed meditation in old days. On Sivaratri, Mondays of Kartika and Kartika Purnima days a large number of people gather here to offer Puja at the temple.

Biranchi Narayan Temple : Buguda is famous for the temple of Biranchinarayan. The temple was built by king Srikara Bhanja who ascended the throne of Ghumusar in 1790 CE. The image of God Biranchinarayan, which is installed in the sanctum of the temple, was recovered from the ruins of Malatigarh. About the finding of the statues, Sewell in his Ghumusar Report has stated that once a herdboy, while tending cattle, struck his foot against a plate of metal at the foot of the hill. Consequently, the villagers dug up the portion and unearthed a life-size image of Suryanarayan which was carried to Buguda where it was consecrated in a new temple. The temple subsequently came to be known as Biranchinarayan. The temple is built in the form of a chariot driven by seven horses. The temple is conspicuous for its remarkable wood carvings and wall paintings. The wood carvings are noticed on the ceiling of the Mandap and on the jambs of the entrance door way as well. At the other end of the main road facing the temple of Biranchinarayan is a temple dedicated to Lord Jagannath. The temple is built in such a manner that the devotees can see the Arati of both the temples at the same time from any of these two places and Best picnic Spot of odisha.

Shinghashini: Located about 20 km from Buguda and is a popular domestic picnic spot surrounded with wild flowers and verdant forest. Presence of Goddess Shinghashini make visitors of all ages come time and again.

Mahula Palli: Host of the Kartika Masa pooja festival.

Bhetanai: on the way from Aska to Buguda, blazed a trail and unveiled its prominence when the sylvan paid due attention to the safety and independence of foxy Black Bucks popularly known as Krushna Sara mruga.

Kubareswar: One of the oldest Shiva temple on the way to Buddhakhola, about 3 km from Buguda.

Jagannath Temple: Located within Buguda, Jagannath Temple is a large temple popularly known as Baladeva temple. Rathayatra, a car festival, is observed like Puri. There is a big street called Bada Danda for the car festival.

Baghua Dam: this is a medium irrigation dam of water resources dept. of government of Odisha. It is situated 13 km from Buguda. This is also a good place for picnic.

Dhanei Dam: this is also a medium irrigation dam of water resources dept. of government of Odisha. It is situated 10 km from Buguda. This is also a good place for picnic, surrounded by natural scenery, forest. There is also an Inspection Bungalow of irrigation dept. to stay.                                         Raikhola Temple, 20 km from Buguda near randi ghai amidst dense forest. Only a well for water.

References 

Cities and towns in Ganjam district